Dörthe Hoppius (born 22 May 1996) is a German footballer who plays as a forward for MSV Duisburg in the Frauen-Bundesliga.

Club career
A native of Dorsten, Hoppius began playing youth football with local sides BVH Dorsten and FC Rhade, before joining VfL Bochum. By age 18, Hoppius had already scored nine goals for VfL Bochum in the 2. Frauen-Bundesliga. Next, she played collegiate soccer for the San Jose State Spartans in the United States, and was awarded the team's top offensive player two years in a row.

When she returned to Germany, Hoppius signed for Frauen-Bundesliga side MSV Duisburg, where she led the team in scoring with eight league goals during the 2018–19 season. She signed for rivals SC Sand following the season. She is also training to be a police officer.

Career statistics

References

External links

1996 births
Living people
People from Recklinghausen
Sportspeople from Münster (region)
Footballers from North Rhine-Westphalia
German women's footballers
Women's association football forwards
VfL Bochum (women) players
San Jose State Spartans women's soccer players
MSV Duisburg (women) players
SC Sand players
2. Frauen-Bundesliga players
Frauen-Bundesliga players
German expatriate footballers
German expatriate sportspeople in the United States
Expatriate women's soccer players in the United States